Glatfelter is a global manufacturer of engineered materials. The company's products are found in tea and single-serve coffee filtration, personal hygiene and packaging products as well as home improvement and industrial applications. Headquartered in Charlotte, North Carolina, the company's annualized net sales approximate $1 billion with customers in over 100 countries and approximately 2,560 employees worldwide.  Operations include twelve manufacturing facilities located in the United States, Canada, Germany, France, the United Kingdom, and the Philippines.

The company was started by Philip Henry Glatfelter in 1864. Glatfelter's annual revenues are approximately $1.1 Billion annually, and its common stock is traded on the New York Stock Exchange under the ticker symbol GLT. Glatfelter and its subsidiaries employ approximately 3,250 people worldwide.

History 
 As early as 1880, Glatfelter led the industry with the installation of the world's largest paper machine.
 Glatfelter switched to making paper using wood fiber instead of rags in the 1880s.
 In 1934, Glatfelter began its forestry management initiative, encouraging farmers to plant more trees and prevent soil erosion.
 In 1947, Glatfelter launched a tree farm managed for the growing of sustainable forest crops in Pennsylvania and Maryland.
 Glatfelter's previous President and CEO, George Henry Glatfelter II, is the great-great grandson of the founder, Philip Henry Glatfelter (1837–1907), who also founded York Ice Company, which became York Heating and Air Conditioning.
 Glatfelter's work with sustainable tea packaging was highlighted in the September 2009 issue of the Tea & Coffee Trade Journal.
 In August 2018, Glatfelder announced an agreement to sell its Specialty Papers division to private investment firm Lindsay Goldberg for $360 million, with the sale to close before 2019.
 In February 2020, Glatfelter announced it would relocate its corporate headquarters from York, Pennsylvania to Charlotte, North Carolina later in the year.
 In June 2021, Glatfelter acquired the Mount Holly and Memphis sites. The transaction included Georgia-Pacific’s Mount Holly, North Carolina airlaid manufacturing operation and an R&D development in Memphis Tennessee. The Mount Holly site produces airlaid products focused on table top materials.
 In October 2021, Glatfelter acquired Jacob Holm. Glatfelter acquired four additional manufacturing sites and six sales offices located in the Americas, Europe, and Asia, and approximately 760 employees world-wide.
 August 25, 2022, Glatfelter announced Thomas Fahnemann has been appointed to the role of President and Chief Executive Officer. He replaced Chairman and Chief Executive Officer, Dante C. Parrini, who left the company following a 25-year career. The Board also appointed Kevin Fogarty, independent Glatfelter Board Director and Chairman of the Nominating and Corporate Governance Committee, to the role of Non-Executive Chairman.

Environmental Concerns 
In 2016, Glatfelter's Spring Grove paper mill was listed just outside the top 1% of toxic air pollution sources in the United States, according to the U.S. Environmental Protection Agency, ranking 160 out of 15,461 sites evaluated. The Pennsylvania Department of Environmental Protection cited the company for two significant violations since 2013, and the company has been federally cited for significant violations of the Clean Air Act. In response to these violations and subsequent press coverage, a Glatfelter representative stated to the York Daily Record that the company maintains a commitment to improving its environmental performance. Glatfelter sold the Spring Grove mill in 2018.

Products 

 Airlaid materials
 Composite fibers
 Composite laminates
 Engineered products

 Food and beverage papers
 Home improvement and industrial applications 
 Metallized films and papers
 Personal hygiene materials 
 Packaging products
 Technical specialties

References

External links 

Companies listed on the New York Stock Exchange
Companies based in York County, Pennsylvania
Companies established in 1864
Pulp and paper companies of the United States
York, Pennsylvania
1864 establishments in Pennsylvania